The Star Competition was a sailing event on the program at the 1996 Summer Olympics that was held from 22 July to 2 August 1996 in Savannah, Georgia, United States. Points were awarded for placement in each race. Eleven races were scheduled. Ten were sailed. Each team had two discards.

Results

Daily standings

Conditions at the Star course areas

Notes

References 
 
 
 

 
 

Star
Star (keelboat) competitions
Unisex sailing at the Summer Olympics